Hervé Bochud (born 15 November 1980) is a former professional footballer who played as a centre-back, who spent most of his career in Switzerland. He was also ambassador for the Swiss Association of Football Players (SAFP).

References

External links
 

Living people
1980 births
Swiss men's footballers
French footballers
Association football central defenders
Swiss-French people
Swiss Super League players
Swiss Challenge League players
3. Liga players
AJ Auxerre players
Neuchâtel Xamax FCS players
BSC Young Boys players
Yverdon-Sport FC players
FC Solothurn players
SR Delémont players
FC Baden players
FC Wil players
FC Schaffhausen players
FC Carl Zeiss Jena players
FC Le Mont players
SC Kriens players
French expatriate footballers
Swiss expatriate footballers
French expatriate sportspeople in Germany
Swiss expatriate sportspeople in Germany
Expatriate footballers in Germany